The Conestoga River, also referred to as Conestoga Creek, is a  tributary of the Susquehanna River flowing through the center of Lancaster County, Pennsylvania, United States.

Geography
Its headwaters rise mostly in southern Berks County and northeastern Lancaster County, in an area known as "Bortz's Swamp" or "Penngall Field" (a small area rises in Chester County).

The principal tributaries of the Conestoga River are Cocalico Creek, Mill Creek, and Little Conestoga Creek; they drain into the Conestoga River watershed in the order listed. The Conestoga River and its principal tributaries comprise approximately 114 stream miles, and they drain a watershed area of approximately  if the main stream is alone considered, rising to  when the Cocalico, Mill, and Little Conestoga Creek watersheds are also included.

History
The stream was named after a small tribe of the indigenous Iroquoian-speaking Susquehannock people, called the Susquehannocks by the English of Maryland and Virginia (an Algonquian name, Sasquesahanough, meaning "people of the muddy river") and the Conestoga by the English of Pennsylvania (from Kanastoge, meaning "place of the immersed pole", the name of their village in Pennsylvania). The village of Conestoga was reported to have 2,000 inhabitants in the 17th century, and up to 7,000 people or more may have then lived in the watershed of the Conestoga River. By the early 18th century most of the Conestoga-Susquehannock were compelled to move to the Ohio area, where they gradually lost their distinctiveness as a nation. In 1763 the remaining Susquehannocks at Conestoga were attacked by the Paxton Boys, a group of anti-Indian vigilantes, who killed six of them at their village of Conestoga, and, two weeks later, despite official protection, killed fourteen of the remaining sixteen at the Lancaster workhouse. The two surviving Conestoga-Susquehannock worked as servants on a local farm until they died and were buried there.

The first steamboat in America floated on the Conestoga in 1763. In the 19th century the name of the river gained wider recognition with the spread of the Conestoga wagon, first built in and named after this valley. The wagon assisted the transportation of freight throughout the East, and later was adapted to help transport goods to the western frontier of the United States. So many cigars were made in the watershed in the late 19th century that a local cigar named the Conestoga became known as the "stogie" throughout the US. In the early nineteenth century, it was possible to travel by boat to Lancaster city from Chesapeake Bay through a system of locks. Though the Conestoga is smaller than most streams generally designated a river, local boosterism in the late 19th century insisted that any stream holding scheduled commercial transport should be so called; steamboat service to a local amusement park along its banks (Rocky Springs Amusement Park in Lancaster) barely qualified, but the designation caught on. The name "Conestoga" has also been applied to the Conestoga Rocket, a rocket produced from Minuteman I parts and launched from Matagorda Island, the ship Conestoga, which is a popular diving wreck in the Thousand Islands, the C-93 Conestoga cargo aircraft, and, in Star Trek, the name of the starship used in the failed first attempt at deep space colonization.

Watershed
Land use along the stream has been traditionally agricultural, though spreading urbanization has affected the stream with erosion problems. Though scenic, the Conestoga River is impaired from nitrogen and phosphorus pollution, mostly runoff from animal waste and excessive commercial fertilizer. Other pollution sources are sediments from intense cropping, development, and urban runoff. The stream flows through a pastoral landscape farmed extensively by Pennsylvania German farmers and along the eastern and southern outskirts of the city of Lancaster. Many covered bridges span its banks. Northeast of Lancaster city are many Old Order Amish and Old Order Mennonite farms; horse and carriage traffic frequents local roads. Many small dams impound its waters, most of them built long ago to power mills or generate electricity. Most dams are in disrepair and have been abandoned, though there is an active movement to remove as many as possible. Seven were removed between 1996 and 1999.

Crossings

Covered bridges
Hunsecker's Mill Covered Bridge 
Pinetown Bushong's Mill Covered Bridge 
Pool Forge Covered Bridge 
Kurtz's Mill Covered Bridge , spanned the Conestoga River before it was moved to a new location
Zook's Mill Covered Bridge , spans Cocalico Creek just upstream from its confluence with the Conestoga
Bitzer's Mill Covered Bridge
Weaver's Mill Covered Bridge
Pool Forge Covered Bridge
Other
Safe Harbor Bridge, of the Enola Low Grade
Conestoga Creek Viaduct, a stone arch railroad bridge
Bridge in West Earl Township, a concrete bridge
Weaverland Bridge, a concrete bowstring arch truss

See also
List of crossings of the Conestoga River
List of rivers of Pennsylvania
Conestogo River in Ontario and named after Conestoga River

References

External links
Conestoga River Watershed Interim Report 2007
U.S. Geological Survey: PA stream gaging stations
Map of old Conestoga River
Aerial image of Conestoga River flowing east and south of Lancaster, PA
Conestoga River near Slackwater, PA
Little Conestoga Watershed Alliance
Conestoga Trail map - northern section (Links to other sections of the trail are found on the right at this link.)
summary description of Conestoga Trail
another Conestoga Trail map

 
Rivers of Pennsylvania
Tributaries of the Susquehanna River
Rivers of Lancaster County, Pennsylvania
Rivers of Berks County, Pennsylvania
Rivers of Chester County, Pennsylvania